Hewitt is a village in Wood County, Wisconsin, United States. The population was 828 at the 2010 census.

History
The community was named in honor of Henry Hewitt, Sr., a businessperson in the local lumber industry.

Geography
Hewitt is located at  (44.640069, -90.107265).

Demographics

2010 census
As of the census of 2010, there were 828 people, 308 households, and 247 families living in the village. The racial makeup of the village was 98.6% White, 1.0% Asian, 0.1% from other races, and 0.4% from two or more races. Hispanic or Latino of any race were 1.0% of the population.

There were 308 households, of which 38.3% had children under the age of 18 living with them, 72.1% were married couples living together, 5.8% had a female householder with no husband present, 2.3% had a male householder with no wife present, and 19.8% were non-families. 15.3% of all households were made up of individuals, and 5.2% had someone living alone who was 65 years of age or older. The average household size was 2.69 and the average family size was 3.02.

The median age in the village was 41.1 years. 26.6% of residents were under the age of 18; 6.2% were between the ages of 18 and 24; 22.8% were from 25 to 44; 35.1% were from 45 to 64; and 9.3% were 65 years of age or older. The gender makeup of the village was 49.3% male and 50.7% female.

2000 census
As of the census of 2000, there were 670 people, 233 households, and 192 families living in the village. The population density was 830.8 people per square mile (319.4/km2). There were 237 housing units at an average density of 293.9/sq mi (113.0/km2). The racial makeup of the village was 99.70% White and 0.30% Asian. Hispanic or Latino of any race were 0.30% of the population.

There were 233 households, out of which 48.5% had children under the age of 18 living with them, 76.0% were married couples living together, 3.9% had a female householder with no husband present, and 17.2% were non-families. 13.7% of all households were made up of individuals, and 6.4% had someone living alone who was 65 years of age or older. The average household size was 2.88 and the average family size was 3.17.

In the village, the population was spread out, with 31.9% under the age of 18, 4.2% from 18 to 24, 32.5% from 25 to 44, 22.4% from 45 to 64, and 9.0% who were 65 years of age or older. The median age was 36 years. For every 100 females, there were 87.7 males. For every 100 females age 18 and over, there were 91.6 males.

The median income for a household in the village was $53,295, and the median income for a family was $56,875. Males had a median income of $38,625 versus $24,688 for females. The per capita income for the village was $19,234. About 2.0% of families and 2.9% of the population were below the poverty line, including 2.3% of those under age 18 and 8.8% of those age 65 or over.

Climate
The Köppen Climate Classification subtype for this climate is "Dfb". (Warm Summer Continental Climate).

Notable people
Felix Ley, Roman Catholic bishop, was born in Hewitt, Wisconsin, raised in Marshfield.

References

External links
Village of Hewitt
1909 plat map of Hewitt
1928 plat map

Villages in Wisconsin
Villages in Wood County, Wisconsin